Rainford Village railway station was on the railway line from St Helens to Rainford Junction, then Ormskirk, England.

Opening and early history

The station was opened on 1 February 1858 by the St Helens Canal and Railway Company (SHC&R).  The SHC&R was absorbed by the London & North Western Railway (LNWR) on 29 July 1864. From 1 January 1923 the LNWR became part of the London Midland & Scottish Railway (LMS). From 1858 until November 1861, the station was named 'Rainford', but it was thought this would cause confusion with Rainford Junction railway station and the word 'Village' was added.

Location and facilities

The station was located immediately north of the level crossing over Crosspit Lane. The main station building for trains to St Helens was on the east side of the twin tracks (furthest from the village centre). A lightly constructed wooden building on the opposite side of the tracks sufficed for passengers towards Rainford Junction and Ormskirk, next to which was the signalbox which controlled the level crossing gates.

Nearby railway halts

Two small lightly built railway 'halts' were constructed nearby to serve other parts of the Rainford area. Rookery, adjacent to Rookery Lane, existed from 1865 until 18 June 1951. Old Mill Lane, adjacent to Pilkington Brothers sand washery a mile south of the village, opened on 1 October 1911 and closed on 18 June 1951.

Passenger train service

The three stations were served by local steam loco-hauled trains, some originating in Ormskirk, with others starting at Rainford Junction. In July 1922, thirteen LNWR trains left Rainford Village for St Helens (Shaw Street) each weekday, all carrying only third class passengers, first class accommodation not being provided.

By July 1946, the LMS timetable showed ten weekdays passenger trains to St Helens, still described as 'one class only'.

In 1951 the Up service consisted of five trains on weekdays with three extra on Saturdays, all stations to St Helens. The rolling stock was "Third Class Only". No trains called on Sundays. The Down service was similar.

British Railways took over the LMSR on 1 January 1948 and withdrew the passenger service on 18 June 1951, closing the station.

Use of the line by goods trains and post-closure history

Rainford Brewery was situated a short distance west of the station. It was rail connected between at least 1890 and 1925.

Victoria Colliery's Nos 3 and 5 pits were connected to the line a short distance north of the station. The colliery went into liquidation in 1891. Around 1900 an engineering firm was established on the colliery site and the siding's connection was renewed in 1905. Over time the engineering works became an oil works, which continued to use rail until August 1961, though cessation was not formally agreed until September 1963.

Goods trains continued to pass through the village until 6 July 1964 when the line north of Mill Lane was closed and lifted. Much of the railway's route through Rainford has been converted to a 'linear park', with shorter stretches used for housing.

References

Notes

Sources

External links
 A detailed history via Disused Stations UK
 The station on an 1888–1913 Overlay OS Map via National Library of Scotland
 The station on an old O.S. Map via npemaps

Disused railway stations in St Helens, Merseyside
Former London and North Western Railway stations
Railway stations in Great Britain opened in 1858
Railway stations in Great Britain closed in 1951
Village railway station